The 1934–35 season was Stoke City's 35th season in the Football League and the 21st in the First Division.

Stoke had an unprecedented amount of funds available as the chairman announced that they had recorded a £13,422 profit. The results on the pitch were similar to last season this time in reverse order with Stoke having a good first half but a poor second half to the campaign. Stoke finished in 10th position with 42 points.

Season review

League
Chairman Sherwin went on record in the summer of 1934 by saying never before in its history has the club been in such a good position financially, Stoke had just made a profit of £13,422. There was a considerable talk of more ground improvements to be made to the Victoria Ground, but some fans wanted the money to be spent on the development of younger players.

Stoke started the 1934–35 season by losing 4–1 at Sheffield Wednesday but then quickly made amends by beating Leeds United 8–1 in their opening home match with Stanley Matthews scoring four goals which earned him his first England call up. Another local star to emerge from the youth team was forward Freddie Steele who used to work for Downings Tileries before becoming a professional footballer. Stoke started the campaign well and for one week in October they sat top of the table. They remained in the top five until February but a disappointing run of results towards the end of the season saw them finish in mid-table position of 10th.

FA Cup
Stoke were embarrassed in this season's FA Cup losing, 4–1, away at Swansea Town.

Final league table

Results
Stoke's score comes first

Legend

Football League First Division

FA Cup

Squad statistics

References

Stoke City F.C. seasons
Stoke